Armando may refer to: 

 Armando (given name)
 Armando (artist) (1929–2018), the name used by Dutch artist Herman Dirk van Dodeweerd
 Armando (producer) (1970–1996), Chicago house producer
 Armando (album), studio album by rapper Pitbull
 Armando (Planet of the Apes), a fictional character